Fimbristylis polytrichoides is a species of fimbry known by the common name rusty sedge, native to east Africa, Madagascar, China, Southeast Asia, New Guinea and Australia. The plant is common along the coast line and estuaries of Australia. The flowers are a distinctive rusty brown color appearing on a single spikelet from May to July.

References

External links
Online Field guide to Common Saltmarsh Plants of Queensland

polytrichoides
Flora of Asia
Flora of Australia
Flora of Africa
Flora of Madagascar
Flora of New Guinea
Plants described in 1786